Mouhoun may refer to:
 Mouhoun Province, a province of Burkina Faso
 Mouhoun River or Black Volta, a river flowing through Burkina Faso